Nordaustpynten is a headland at Kongsøya of the Kong Karls Land, Svalbard, the most northeastern point of the island.

References

Headlands of Svalbard
Kongsøya